Deblín is a market town in Brno-Country District in the South Moravian Region of the Czech Republic. It has about 1,100 inhabitants.

Geography
It lies in the Křižanov Highlands. The Závistka Stream springs here and flows through the village.

History
The first written mention of Deblín is from 1173, when a castle with a Romanesque-Gothic basilica stood here.

Sights
The landmark of Deblín is the Church of Saint Nicholas. It was built on the site of the original basilica and despite its Gothic-Baroque style, it has some Romanesque elements.

References

External links

Populated places in Brno-Country District
Market towns in the Czech Republic